Mort Rosenblum (born 1944), is an American author, editor and journalist.

Biography
When only 17, Rosenblum left the University of Arizona in Tucson to work at the 
Mexico City Times and then wrote for the Caracas Daily Journal. He joined the Associated Press at Newark in 1965.

His international career began in 1967, when the AP sent him to cover mercenary wars in Congo. Since then Rosenblum has run AP bureaus in Kinshasa, Lagos, Kuala Lumpur, Jakarta, Singapore, Buenos Aires, and Paris. From 1979 to 1981, he was editor of the International Herald Tribune but later returned to AP as special correspondent, based in Paris. 

Rosenblum left AP in 2004, and in 2008, launched dispatches, a British quarterly magazine with co-editor Gary Knight and publisher Dr. Simba Gill, which ceased publication after five issues. Additionally, Rosenblum is a professor of journalism at the University of Arizona, Tucson, where he teaches International Reporting.

Honors and accomplishments
Rosenblum won an Overseas Press Club Award in 1989. Additionally, he won AP's top reporting award in 1990, 2000 and 2001.

Books
Little Bunch of Madmen: Elements of Global Reporting (2010)
Escaping Plato's Cave (2007)
Chocolate: A Bittersweet Saga of Dark and Light (2006)
A Goose in Toulouse (2000)
Olives (2000)The Secret Life of the Seine (1995)
 Who Stole the News? (1993)
 The Abortion Pill (1991) With Etienne-Emile Baulieu.
 Squandering Eden (1990)
 Moments of Revolution - Eastern Europe (1990)
 Back Home: A Foreign Correspondent Rediscovers America (1989)
 Mission to Civilize (1988)
 Coups and Earthquakes (1981)

Recent Works
Violence Threatens Mexico's Soul. Retrieved on 13-04-09.
If We Fly Blind, Geese are the least of it. Retrieved on 13-04-09.

References

External links
Mort Rosenblum.

dispatches/rethink dispatches.com: The online companion to the quarterly journal.
No Mere 'Mort'al: Rosenblum Still Going Strong a profile written by JSAC Journal reporter Nathan Mitchell.

Living people
American male journalists
American war correspondents
University of Arizona faculty
International Herald Tribune people
1944 births
James Beard Foundation Award winners